The Mississippi Department of Wildlife, Fisheries, and Parks (MDWFP), formerly known as the Mississippi Game & Fish Commission, is an agency of the government of the U.S. state of Mississippi responsible for programs protecting Mississippi fish and wildlife resources and their habitats, as well as administering all state parks; it has its headquarters in Jackson.

The agency issues hunting and fishing licenses, advises on habitat protection, and sponsors public education programs. It is also responsible for enforcement of Mississippi's fish and game laws. It is separate from the Mississippi Department of Marine Resources, which is the governing body for the state's natural salt-water resources and law enforcement thereof (i.e. Gulf of Mexico, ocean-going vessels, etc.).

Leadership
The Mississippi Department of  Wildlife, Fisheries, and Parks is made up of five people and are known as the Mississippi Commission on Wildlife, Fisheries, and Parks. These people are appointed by the Governor, however the state Senate must approve them. They serve for a five-year term. The four of the appointments come from each congressional district and the fifth appointment comes from the state at-large.

The 5-member commission elects one of them to be chairman and one of them to be vice-chairman. The chairman oversees meetings of the commission and the vice-chairman oversees meetings of the commission when the chairman is absent.

The commission establishes and removes regulations and ordinances as they related to the department. The commission also carries out other duties, responsibilities and powers as they are instructed by government order such as by law or executive order from the Governor.

Mission

The department operates six programs in carrying out its mission:

The Parks and Recreation Program
The Freshwater Fisheries Management Program
The Wildlife Management Program
The Mississippi Museum of Natural Science Program
The Law Enforcement Program
The Support Services Program

See also

List of law enforcement agencies in Mississippi
List of State Fish and Wildlife Management Agencies in the U.S.

References

External links
Mississippi Department of Wildlife, Fisheries, and Parks - Official web site

State law enforcement agencies of Mississippi